Colautti is an Italian surname. Notable people with the surname include:

 Roberto Colautti, Argentine-Israeli former professional footballer
 Arturo Colautti, Italian journalist, polemicist and librettist

See also
Colautti v. Franklin

References

Italian-language surnames